Warhammer may refer to:

 War hammer, a medieval weapon

Warhammer media franchise
Warhammer, a series of games and related media:

Warhammer (game), a table-top fantasy miniature wargame, and origin of the franchise
Warhammer Fantasy (setting), the fictional setting of the various games and media
Warhammer Age of Sigmar, the successor to Warhammer
Warhammer Fantasy Roleplay, a fantasy role-playing game
Warhammer Quest, a board game

 Warhammer 40,000, a table-top futuristic science-fantasy miniature wargame
 Video games set in the Warhammer universe:
Warhammer: Shadow of the Horned Rat, 1995 real-time tactics video game
Warhammer: Dark Omen, 1998 real-time tactics video game
Warhammer: The End Times - Vermintide, 2015 adventure game
Total War: Warhammer, 2016 turn-based strategy real-time tactics video game
Total War: Warhammer II, 2017 turn-based strategy real-time tactics video game
Warhammer: Vermintide 2, 2018 adventure game 
Warhammer: Chaosbane, 2019 adventure game

See also

 
 
 
 
 
 Hammer (disambiguation)
 War (disambiguation)
 Operation Hammer (disambiguation), military operations named "Hammer"
 Hammer and sickle (disambiguation)
 Arm and hammer (disambiguation)
 Battleaxe (disambiguation)